Hase is a river in north-western Germany.

Hase may also refer to:

Places 
 Hase (crater), on the Moon
 Hase, Nagano, a village in Kamiina District, Nagano, Japan

People 
 Hase Ferhatović (1933–1987), Yugoslav footballer
 Carl Benedict Hase (1780–1864), French Hellenist of German extraction
 Henry Hase (1847–1929), American politician
 Hiroshi Hase (born 1961), Japanese professional wrestler
 Johann Matthias Hase (1684–1742), German mathematician and astronomer
 Juan Carlos Hase (born 1948), Argentine chess master
 Karl August von Hase (1800–1890), German Protestant theologian and Church historian
, Japanese swimmer
 Marica Hase (born 1981), Japanese pornographic actress
 Minerva Fabienne Hase (born  1999), German pair skater
 Paul von Hase (1885–1944), German general who was part of the resistance against Adolf Hitler's Nazi régime
 Patrick Hase (fl. 1972–1996), a Hong Kong-based historian and a retired civil servant

Other uses 
 Hase, an outdoor sculpture at Colletto Fava near Genoa, Italy
 September Hase, an alternative rock band from Nashville, Tennessee

Japanese-language surnames